The 1926 season of the Auckland Rugby League was its 17th.

Ponsonby won the Monteith Shield, the major first grade title after defeating City Rovers in the final. Richmond won their first ever senior trophy when they won the Roope Rooster. On the last week of the season these teams met for the Stormont Shield with Ponsonby winning by 15 points to 5 over. Northcote won the B Division championship, with Kingsland winning the Stallard Cup for taking out the B division knockout competition. The representative season was dominated by a long series of trial matches to assist in selecting the New Zealand team to tour England.

Athletic club name change 
At the annual general meeting of the Athletic Rugby League Football Club the idea of adopting the name of Grafton Athletic was discussed though no decision was made at the time it was later agreed to change the club name to Grafton. They were known as 'Maritime' from their formation in 1918 and remained as such for four years until the start of the 1922 season when they changed their name to Athletic. They remained 'Athletic' for four years until deciding to change their name again in this 1926 season to Grafton Athletic. There had previously already been a Grafton Athletic club which formed in 1914 under the leadership of Karl Ifwersen and they survived for seven years until the 1920 season which was their last after Ifwersen switched back to the rugby code.

Senior competitions 
Nominations were received for 13 teams to compete in the Senior Grade. It was decided to have an A section and a B section like the 1925 season. In the A section competing for the Monteith Shield would be the same 7 teams as the previous year. They were Ponsonby United, City Rovers, Marist Old Boys, Devonport United, Richmond Rovers, Newton Rangers, and Grafton Athletic (previously named 'Maritime' from 1918–21 and then Athletic from 1922–25). The same 5 teams would compete in the B section with the addition of Parnell. The teams in that section were Northcote, Kingsland, Ellerslie, Mangere (not the present day club), Otahuhu, and Parnell.

Jim Parkes who had moved to Auckland and begun playing for Richmond was also to coach the side. With the Monteith Shield competition nearing its later stages L Taylor joined the Richmond club from the Whitiora club in Hamilton. He scored 54 points in just 6 games for Richmond which meant he finished as the second highest scorer for the season behind Maurice Wetherill. During the season the New Zealand team was chosen to tour England and many clubs were hard hit by player losses to the tour. Wetherill was almost a certainty to make the tour but was unavailable to tour. He remained with his City Rovers team who qualified for the final with Ponsonby United but could not lead them to the title.

Carlaw Park 
Albert Asher the well known former New Zealand international was appointed to work on the ground staff at Carlaw Park. He would be busy mid season when torrential rain leading up to the round 5 matches forced their abandonment. A large hole opened up on the number one field due to water overflowing from the railway embankment and the surrounding hills overwhelmed the surface drains. "As a result, the water forced its way back, emerging from a joint in the main pipe. The ground for some feet around was raised and, when it subsided, an open hole was revealed". It took several days to repair the playing area which was open again for the following weekend. In December proposed plans for Carlaw Park's redevelopment were released though they were not carried out as shown in the image. The image showed the terraces becoming a large multilevel stand with a terrace type stand where the railway stand was at the time.

Representative program 
A large number of representative and trial matches were played on Carlaw Park during the course of the season. The New Zealand team was to tour England later in the year and so several trial matches were played including Auckland v South Auckland, North Island v South Island, A v B team matches, a 'probables' v 'possibles' game, Auckland v The Rest of New Zealand, and ultimately after the team had been selected Auckland played them before they departed. Then near the end of the season Auckland defended the Northern Union Challenge Cup 3 times against Otago, Canterbury, and South Auckland (Waikato). The season was then concluded with an Auckland Colts match against the B Division representative side.

The Auckland members of the New Zealand team to tour England were:Craddock Dufty (Grafton), Charles Gregory (Marist), George Gardiner (Ponsonby), Jim Parkes (Richmond), Lou Brown (City), Ben Davidson (City), Jack Kirwan (Marist), Hec Brisbane (Marist), Hector Cole (Ponsonby), Stan Webb (Devonport), Frank Delgrosso (Ponsonby), Ernie Herring (Grafton), Arthur Singe (Marist), Bert Avery (Grafton). Avery was to captain the touring side.

During the tour 7 players went on strike due to a large number of issues they had with the management of the tour and upon their return the New Zealand Rugby League administration banned each of them for life. The only Aucklander to be among the strikers banned was Arthur Singe, the Marist Old Boys hooker. He had joined them after switching from rugby in 1921 where he had represented the New Zealand Army team in 1919 on their British and South African tours and Auckland in 8 matches. He played 48 times for Marist, 15 times for Auckland and made 8 appearances for New Zealand before his ban. The ban was eventually lifted by the New Zealand Rugby League in 1962, 26 years after his death in 1936.

Obituary

Robert Alexander Bovaird
On December 30, 1925 Robert (Bert) Alexander Bovaird passed away at the age of 34. He was the secretary of the Auckland Rugby League Referees association for the past 3 years and had refereed for several years including at senior level after previously being a player. He was "a very painstaking and obliging official, and carried out his duties with credit and satisfaction". He had owned a general store on Great North Road at Morningside and his body was found in the Auckland Domain in the morning after he had died of a self inflicted gun shot wound. The representatives of the Referees Association acted as pall-bearers at the request of relatives. He left behind a wife, Valerie Bovaird (nee. Tattersall), and an 8 year old daughter (Audrey).

Monteith Shield (first grade championship) 
On 22 May all A and B division matches were postponed due to poor weather. Carlaw Park also suffered damage when water overflowed from the railway embankment and adjoining hills which proved too much for the surface drains. It caused the ground to subside and a hole to open up which would take some time to repair.

Monteith Shield standings 
With 1 round remaining Ponsonby was on 18 competition points and City were on 20 competition points. City had a bye and Ponsonby were due to play Grafton however owing to the likely outcome of Ponsonby defeating Grafton Athletic (who were last) which would mean the two teams would be tied on points the ARL decided to have Ponsonby and City playoff for the title instead. This was a regular method of deciding the title winners through this era and had happened in 1911, 1914, 1915, 1923, and 1924. Ponsonby won 13–8 and the result is included in the standings.
{|
|-
|

Monteith Shield fixtures 
In Round 12 new rules were introduced regarding the play the ball, mirroring rules adopted by the New South Wales Rugby League which made the games more open but it was stated in The New Zealand Herald that "it is evident the players will need more schooling to make the interpretation of this rule more effective. In the match between Ponsonby and Richmond every advantage was taken of the referee's awkward position, and some very unfair tactics were adopted in securing the ball from the ruck".

Round 1 
In the match between Ponsonby and Devonport Lyall Stewart went off after 20 minutes with an injury but was able to be replaced, later Julius Laing fractured his ankle while Charles Webb also went off injured during the second half leaving Devonport with just 11 players. Neville St George was also injured during the match and missed several games.

Round 2

Round 3 
Ponsonby's win over Newton in this round was a club milestone, being their 100th first grade win. In their 17th season and 163rd match they became the second club in Auckland to do this after City Rovers achieved the feat 2 seasons earlier.

Round 4 
In the match between Newton Rangers and Richmond Rovers, Roy Hardgrave was thought to have broken his collarbone and was stretchered from the field. However it was later found that he had just received a kick to the shoulder after trying to stop a Richmond forward rush.

Round 5 
Lou Brown tore a ligament in his foot in his match with Grafton and missed several matches but recovered in time to gain selection for the New Zealand team to tour England. His brother E Brown was also injured in the match which also saw G Rayner ordered off.

Round 6 
Frank Delgrosso left the field with a bad cut over his eye against Marist which required stitches and missed some game. Maurice Wetherill also missed City's match as he was sitting a plumbers exam. City were upset by Devonport.

Round 7 
Hec Brisbane made return from a broken collarbone for Marist's match with Richmond. Roy Hardgrave of Newton also returned from his shoulder injury suffered in round 4.

Round 8

Round 9 
Johnson was ordered off early in the match for Grafton against Marist.

Round 10 
Clarrie Polson, Newton's New Zealand representative was leaving at this point in the season to go and live in Wellington. Eric Grey came out of retirement to play for Ponsonby. In his first game since 1924 he scored a try and kicked a drop goal in their win over Newton.

Round 11 
L Taylor transferred from the Whitiora rugby league club in Hamilton and scored a try and kicked 6 goals on debut for Richmond and went on to become the second highest point scorer in senior competition from just 6 games.

Round 12 
Newton only had 10 players for the entirety of their match with Marist but still made a game of it only losing 15–11.

Round 13

Final

Roope Rooster knockout competition 
Richmond Bulldogs won the Roope Rooster for the first time with a 16–15 win over Devonport in the final. This was their first major trophy.

Round 1

Semi-finals 
Wilfred McNeil of the Ponsonby side broke a rib and received treatment at Auckland Hospital before being discharged. While W. Donald of the Richmond side also went to hospital after suffering a broken collarbone and concussion. He was also able to go home after treatment.

Final

Stormont Shield 
Ponsonby won the Stormont Shield again after winning it in the previous season which was the first year it had been contested after the passing of Bill Stormont months earlier who it was named in honour of.

Top try scorers and point scorers (senior grade and Roope Rooster)

B Division standings and results

B Division standings
{|
|-
|

B Division results
At the start of the season Auckland Rugby League secured the use of part of the Otahuhu Trotting Ground to play games at. Primarily Otahuhu played their matches there, both the B grade side and their lower grade teams. Auckland Rugby League had the use of the ground until around 1930 with Auckland Rugby using the grounds for a handful of years before it was no longer used by sports teams.

In Round 6 Parnell defaulted to Ellerslie with the club secretary saying "the fact that five men are on the injured list and that others have had to leave town to seek work in the country were the chief factors".

Stallard Cup knockout competition
This was the second year that the B Division knockout competition had been competed for.

Other club matches and lower grades

Lower grade competitions

Second grade
Devonport beat City in the final on September 18 by 6 points to 3. Grafton won the knockout final when they beat Point Chevalier. They had defeated Kingsland and Ponsonby in the semi finals respectively. Marist withdrew after 2 rounds while Newton withdrew after 10 rounds, Otahuhu after 13 rounds, and Mangere after 15. A large number of results were not reported so the standings are incomplete.
{|
|-
|

Third grade
Grafton Athletic won the championship and had a season record of 19 wins and 1 loss, for 371, against 63 including their 2 knockout games where they defeated United Suburbs in the semi final and Devonport United in the final. Ellerslie withdrew after 7 rounds. The majority of match scores were not reported in the newspapers so the standings are incomplete.
{|
|-
|

Third grade intermediate
Richmond had a 10 win, 2 loss record for the season and also won the knockout competition. They scored 127 points and conceded 57. They defeated Devonport in the knockout final after beating Newton 5-0 in the semi finals. Devonport had beaten Glen Eden 21-4 in the other semi final. United Suburbs withdrew after 2 rounds while Parnell withdrew after 9 rounds. Curiously Glen Eden joined the competition in the 5th round, then Mangere joined in the 9th round, while a Ponsonby side was also listed in the fixtures for the 9th round but no other rounds. Very few results were reported though it was mentioned that Richmond had won 10 matches and lost 2, scoring 127 and conceding 57 though it is unknown if this also included their knockout matches.
{|
|-
|

Fourth grade
Parnell won the championship. Richmond won the knockout competition defeating Grafton 6-3 in the final on October 23. Richmond had beaten Parnell in one semi final while Grafton defeated City in the other. Marist withdrew from the competition after 2 rounds, New Lynn after 3 rounds, Newton after 9 rounds, and Otahuhu after 13. A significant number of results were not reported however 13 of Parnell's 14 results were reported. On September 4 in the match between Ellerslie and Richmond the referee ordered the entire Ellerslie team off at halftime due to verbal abuse while they were leading 8-5. The match was awarded to Richmond.
{|
|-
|

Fifth grade
Richmond won the competition and they also won the knockout competition when they defeated Northcote in the final on October 9. Northcote turned their season around after suffering several heavy losses and temporarily withdrawing from the championship before later rejoining and winning some matches. Grafton withdrew after 12 rounds. The majority of results were not reported. On September 11 in the final round the only match played was between Richmond and Devonport with Richmond winning 13-11. It is possible that this match was the final of the championship. All of Devonport's 3 defeats were to Richmond while they easily won their other two reported results (20-2 and 19-0 over Ponsonby and Grafton respectively). 
{|
|-
|

Sixth grade A
City A won the championship. They also beat Richmond in the 6th grade knockout competition by 27 points to 3 on October 9. City had defeated Akarana in the semi final.
{|
|-
|

Sixth grade B
Richmond won the 6th grade A championship. Grafton won the knockout competition when they defeated Richmond in the final on August 28 by 8 points to 0. There were several results not reported so the standings are incomplete. The City side joined in the 3rd round which created a 5 team competition and the need for a bye each round.

References

External links
 Auckland Rugby League Official Site

Auckland Rugby League
Auckland Rugby League seasons